"Working with Fire and Steel" is a song by English new wave and synth-pop band China Crisis, released as a single from their second studio album Working with Fire and Steel – Possible Pop Songs Volume Two (1983). It peaked at No. 48 on the UK Singles Chart and at No. 47 in Australia. It was also a hit on the U.S. Billboard Hot Dance Club Songs chart where it reached No. 27.

Track listing
UK 7" single / 7" silver vinyl
"Working with Fire and Steel"
"Dockland"
"Forever I and I"

UK 12" single
"Working with Fire and Steel"
"Fire and Steel" (Mix)
"Dockland"
"Forever I and I"

US 12" single (Warner Bros.)
"Working with Fire and Steel"
"Fire and Steel" (Mix)
"Dockland"
"Forever I and I"

Canada 7" single (Virgin)
"Working with Fire and Steel"
"Dockland"

Europe 7" single
"Working with Fire and Steel"
"Forever I and I"

References

External links

1983 songs
1983 singles
China Crisis songs
Virgin Records singles
Song recordings produced by Mike Howlett